The Mediterranean and Middle East Theatre was a major theatre of operations during the Second World War. The vast size of the Mediterranean and Middle East theatre saw interconnected naval, land, and air campaigns fought for control of the Mediterranean, North Africa, the Horn of Africa, the Middle East and Southern Europe. The fighting in this theatre lasted from 10 June 1940, when Italy entered the war on the side of Germany, until 2 May 1945 when all Axis forces in Italy surrendered. However, fighting would continue in Greece – where British troops had been dispatched to aid the Greek government – during the early stages of the Greek Civil War.

The British referred to this theatre as the Mediterranean and Middle East Theatre (so called due to the location of the fighting and the name of Middle East Command), the Americans called it the Mediterranean Theater of War and the German informal official history of the fighting is The Mediterranean, South-East Europe, and North Africa 1939–1941 (1995). Regardless of the size of the theatre, the various campaigns were not seen as neatly separated areas of operations but part of a vast theatre of war.

Fascist Italy aimed to carve out a new Roman Empire, while British forces aimed initially to retain the status quo.  Italy invaded Greece, and not until the introduction of German forces were Greece and Yugoslavia overrun.  Allied and Axis forces fought back and forth across North Africa, while Axis interference in the Middle East caused fighting to spread there.  With confidence high from early gains, German forces planned to capture the Middle East with a view to possibly attacking the southern border of the Soviet Union.  In three years of fighting, Axis forces were defeated in North Africa and their interference in the Middle East was halted. The anti-Axis coalition then commenced the Allied invasion of Italy, resulting in the Italians deposing Mussolini and joining the Allies. A prolonged battle for Italy took place between Allied and Axis forces. As the strategic situation changed in south-east Europe, British troops returned to Greece.

The theatre of war had the longest duration of the Second World War, resulted in the destruction of the Italian Empire and severely undermined the strategic position of Germany, resulting in German divisions being deployed to Africa and Italy and total German losses (including those captured upon final surrender) being over two million. Italian losses amounted to around 177,000 men with a further several hundred thousand captured during the process of the various campaigns. British losses amount to over 300,000 men killed, wounded, or captured, and total American losses in the region amounted to 130,000.

Background

Italy 

During the late 1920s, Benito Mussolini claimed that Italy needed an outlet for its "surplus population" and that it would be in other countries' best interests to aid in this expansion. The regime wanted "hegemony in the Mediterranean–Danubian–Balkan region" and the gaining of world power by the conquest "of an empire stretching from the Strait of Gibraltar to the Strait of Hormuz". The Fascists had designs on Albania, Dalmatia, large parts of Slovenia, Croatia, Bosnia and Herzegovina, Macedonia and Greece and harked back to the Roman empire. The regime also sought to establish protectorates with Austria, Hungary, Romania and Bulgaria. Covert motives were for Italy to become the dominant power in the Mediterranean, capable of challenging France or Britain and gaining access to the Atlantic and Indian Oceans.

On 30 November 1938, Mussolini addressed the Fascist Grand Council on the goal of capturing Albania, Tunisia, Corsica, the Ticino canton of Switzerland and "French territory east of the River Var (to include Nice, but not Savoy)". Mussolini alleged that Italy required uncontested access to the oceans and shipping lanes to ensure its national sovereignty. Italy was a "prisoner in the Mediterranean" and had to break the chains of British and French control. Corsica, Cyprus, Gibraltar, Malta, Suez and Tunisia would need to be taken and Egypt, France, Greece, Turkey and the United Kingdom had to be challenged. Through armed conquest, the north and east African colonies would be linked and this 'prison' destroyed. Italy would be able to march "either to the Indian Ocean through the Sudan and Abyssinia, or to the Atlantic by way of French North Africa". On 2 October 1935, the Second Italo–Ethiopian War began when Italian forces invaded Abyssinia.

Mussolini lauded the conquest as a new source of raw materials and location for emigration and speculated that a native army could be raised there to "help conquer the Sudan. "Almost as soon as the Abyssinian campaign ended, Italian intervention in the Spanish Civil War" began. On 7 April 1939, Mussolini began the Italian invasion of Albania and within two days had occupied the country. In May 1939, Italy formally allied to Nazi Germany in the Pact of Steel.

Italian foreign policy went through two stages during the Fascist regime. Until 1934–35, Mussolini followed a "modest ... and responsible" course and following that date there was "ceaseless activity and aggression". "Prior to the Italian invasion of Ethiopia, Mussolini had made military agreements with the French and formed a coalition with the British and French to prevent German aggression in Europe." The Ethiopian War "exposed vulnerabilities and created opportunities that Mussolini seized to realise his imperial vision"

Britain 

At the Nyon Conference of 1937, Italy and the United Kingdom "disclaimed any desire to modify or see modified the national sovereignty of any country in the Mediterranean area, and agreed to discourage any activities liable to impair mutual relations." Italian diplomatic and military moves did not reflect this agreement. In the aftermath of the Italian invasion of Abyssinia, British and Italian forces in North Africa were reinforced. Due to various Italian moves, in July 1937, the British decided "that Italy could not now be regarded as a reliable friend" and preparations began to bring "the defences of the Mediterranean and the Red Sea ports up-to-date". In 1938, a weak armoured division was established in Egypt and further army and air force reinforcements were dispatched from Britain.

With rising tension in Europe, in June 1939, the United Kingdom established Middle East Command (MEC) in Cairo to provide centralised command for British army units in the Mediterranean and Middle East theatre. All three branches of the British military were made equally responsible for the defence of the area. The authority of MEC included Aden, British Somaliland, Cyprus, Egypt, Eritrea, Ethiopia, Kenya, Greece, Libya, Palestine, Iraq, Sudan, Tanganyika, Transjordan, Uganda and the shores of the Persian Gulf. If necessary, command would be exerted as far away as the Caucasus and the Indian Ocean. The purpose of the command was to be "the western bastion of defence of India", keep British supply lines open to India and the Far East, and keep the Middle Eastern oilfields out of Axis hands.

Upon the establishment of MEC, it was ordered to co-ordinate with the French military in the Middle East and Africa as well as liaise with the Turkish General Staff and possibly the Greek General Staff. On 19 October 1939, the Treaty of Mutual Assistance was signed between the United Kingdom, France and Turkey and British military forces were authorised to begin discussions with the Turkish general staff; a further conference was held during March 1940. Within a week of the Italian occupation of Albania, France and the United Kingdom "announced they had promised to give all the help in their power if Greek and Romanian independence were threatened and if the Greek Government or Romanian Government considered it vital to resist."

British forces in the Middle East were ordered to avoid provocation. Following the defeat of Poland, the threat of an Axis attack from the Balkans against British positions in the Middle East and Eastern Mediterranean region increased. In late 1939, with the assumption that Britain would soon be at war with Italy, planning began for attacks to capture Bardia and Jaghbub (Giarabub) in Libya and arrangements began in Egypt, to accommodate a much larger force. Preparations to reinforce the Iraqi army were made and Palestinian security forces were to be reduced to the minimum. British forces in East Africa were to study operations to destroy the Italian forces and support local risings, all in support of the main Allied offensive, which was planned to be launched from French Somaliland. Troops in Sudan were also asked to consider launching operations against Kufra in southern Libya.

Initial military operations 
On 10 June 1940, Italy declared war on France and the United Kingdom and next day the British Commonwealth declared war on Italy. The fleets of Italy, France and the United Kingdom began the hostilities of the Battle of the Mediterranean. The siege of Malta soon began, with first Italian air attack on 11 June. In the Western Desert, Royal Air Force (RAF) aircraft attacked Italian positions inside Libya. On 11 June, the Western Desert Campaign began, as the British launched minor raids and conducted patrols along the Libyan–Egyptian border and on 17 June, Fort Capuzzo was captured. On 20 June, Mussolini began the Italian invasion of France, just before the end of the Battle of France. During June, the East African Campaign began with Italian attacks in East Africa, although ground combat did not start until July.

On 22 June, France signed an armistice at Compiegne with Germany and on 24 June, the Franco-Italian Armistice was signed. Italy gained a  demilitarised zone inside France (as well as similar zones where Italian and French colonies met). Italian occupation forces took over an  area of France, which included 28,500 people and the town of Menton. The Royal Navy attacked the French fleet in the North African port of Mers-el-Kébir on 3 July 1940, after it refused to sail to Britain or the French West Indies and demobilise, as part of a larger plan to stop the French fleet from falling into German or Italian hands.

When Italy entered the war, there were no plans for an invasion of Egypt while France was still able to resist. When France surrendered, Mussolini gave instructions for his generals to prepare an offensive. On 10 August, he instructed his forces to be prepared to attack in conjunction with the German invasion of the United Kingdom. While his generals did not believe they were prepared, they were ordered to push forward without any solid objectives.

On 9 September, Italian aircraft start preparation bombardments for the invasion of Egypt. In East Africa, after some initial offensive actions, the Italian conquest of British Somaliland began in August and annexed the colony. After crossing the Albanian border, Italian forces began the Greco-Italian War by invading Greece on 28 October. The Greek army repulsed the Italian attack and commenced a counter-offensive on 14 November, which pushed Italian forces back into Albania.

The Royal Navy inflicted a major setback upon the Italian Royal Navy during the Battle of Taranto on the night of 12/13 November. After assembling enough forces the British launched a counter-attack upon the Italians in Egypt. Operation Compass drove the Italians out of Egypt and resulted in the destruction of the Italian 10th Army in February 1941. Following this success, British forces adopted a defensive position in North Africa and redeployed most troops to Greece in Operation Lustre, leaving a weak force garrisoning the gains made from Operation Compass. In March, the Battle of Kufra ended with the Italians losing the desert oasis of Kufra—a vital link between Italian east and north Africa—which was located in south-eastern Libya.

Axis success

North Africa 

In North Africa, the Italians responded to the defeat of their Tenth Army by dispatching armour and motorised divisions. Germany dispatched the Afrika Korps in Operation Sonnenblume, to bolster the Italians with a mission to block further Allied attempts to drive the Italians out of the region. Its commanding officer—Erwin Rommel—seized on the weakness of his opponents and without waiting for his forces to fully assemble, rapidly went on the offensive. In March–April 1941, Rommel defeated the British forces facing him and forced the British and Commonwealth forces into retreat.

The Siege of Tobruk began by the main Axis force and a small German force pressed eastwards, retaking all territory lost to Operation Compass, and advanced into Egypt. By the end of April, Sollum had fallen and the important Halfaya Pass captured.

Balkans 

In the Balkans, the Greeks had been reluctant to allow British troops into the country, because Britain could not spare enough forces to guarantee victory. They had, however, accepted aid from the RAF in their war with the Italians in Albania. As it became likely Germany would attack Greece, four British divisions were switched from North Africa to reinforce Greek Army. The advanced guards of these troops began arriving in March 1941, triggering the entry of German forces into Bulgaria, which made clear the German intent to invade Greece.

In April 1941, Germans, Italians, Hungarians and Bulgarians made quick work of the Royal Yugoslav army. They captured Yugoslavia in 11 days and partitioned it among themselves and newly formed client states: The Independent State of Croatia and Nedić's Serbia. In spring 1941, Italy created a Montenegrin client state and annexed most of the Dalmatian coast as the Governorship of Dalmatia (Governatorato di Dalmazia). A complex guerrilla uprising of communist-led Partisans, commanded by Josip Broz Tito, soon broke out. A more ambivalent, predominantly Serb paramilitary movement of royalist Chetniks both fought the occupying forces and collaborated with them against the communists. The Partisans eventually gained recognition from the Allies as the sole resistance movement. With help from both the Soviets and the Western Allies, they turned into a formidable fighting force and successfully liberated the country.

Beginning on 6 April, in the ensuing Battle of Greece the Germans had been temporarily held at the border by the Greeks. After moving through south-eastern Yugoslavia, the Germans had been able to turn the Allied flank, cutting off Greek units in the east of the country. Greek forces in central Macedonia were isolated from the Commonwealth forces moving up in an attempt stabilise the front, with the Germans then falling on the rear of the main Greek army facing the Italians in Macedonia. The German advance into Greece was made easier because the bulk of the Greek Army was engaged fighting the Italians on the Albanian front in the north of the country.

The Greeks were forced to capitulate, ending resistance on the mainland by the end of the month. Abandoning most of its equipment, the Commonwealth force retreated to the island of Crete. From 20 May, the Germans attacked the island by using paratroops to secure an air bridgehead despite suffering heavy casualties. They then flew in more troops and were able to capture the rest of the island by 1 June. With their victory in the Battle of Crete the Germans had secured their southern flank and turned their attention towards the Soviet Union.

East Africa 

In East Africa, the British launched a counter-attack against the Italians from Kenya Colony in February 1941. Landings were subsequently conducted in British Somaliland and Italian Ethiopia, while an expedition from the Sudan moved on Addis Ababa. The Italian Viceroy, Duke Amedeo d'Aosta, was forced to surrender by 18 May which effectively ended the campaign, allowing the Empire of Ethiopia to be re-established under Haile Selassie. A number of Italian garrisons continued to hold out, but the last of these, at Gondar, surrendered in November. Small groups of Italian troops carried out the Italian guerrilla war in Ethiopia until October 1943.

Middle East operations

Iraq 

When Italy entered the war the Iraqi government did not break off diplomatic relations, as they had done with Germany. The Italian Legation in Baghdad became the centre for Axis propaganda and for fomenting anti-British feeling. In this they were aided by Mohammad Amin al-Husayni, the British appointee as the Grand Mufti of Jerusalem, who had fled from the British Mandate of Palestine shortly before the outbreak of war and later received asylum in Baghdad. In January 1941, there was a political crisis within Iraq as Rashid Ali resigned as Prime Minister of Iraq and was replaced by Taha al-Hashimi; civil war loomed.

On 1 April, Rashid Ali, along with four senior Army and Air Force officers known as the "Golden Square", seized power via a coup d'état and Rashid Ali proclaimed himself Chief of the "National Defence Government." The Golden Square deposed al-Hashimi and restored Rashid Ali. Ali did not overthrow the monarchy and named a new Regent to King Faisal II, Sherif Sharaf. The leaders of the "National Defence Government" proceeded to arrest many pro-British citizens and politicians but many escaped through Amman in Transjordan. The new regime planned to refuse further concessions to the United Kingdom, to retain diplomatic links with Fascist Italy and to expel the most prominent pro-British politicians. The plotters considered the United Kingdom to be weak and believed that its government would negotiate with their new government regardless of its legality. On 17 April, Rashid Ali, on behalf of the "National Defence Government" asked Germany for military assistance in the event of war with the British. Ali attempted to restrict British rights guaranteed under Article 5 of the 1930 Anglo-Iraqi Treaty, when he insisted that newly arrived British troops quickly be transported through Iraq and to Palestine.

Before the coup, Rashid Ali's supporters had been informed that Germany would recognise the independence of Iraq from the British Empire. There had also been discussions on war material being sent to support the Iraqis and other Arab factions in fighting the British. On 3 May, German Foreign Minister Joachim von Ribbentrop persuaded Adolf Hitler to secretly return Dr. Fritz Grobba to Iraq to lead a diplomatic mission to channel support to the Rashid Ali regime but the British quickly learned of the German arrangements through intercepted Italian diplomatic transmissions. On 6 May, in accordance with the Paris Protocols, Germany concluded a deal with the Vichy French government to release war materials, including aircraft, from sealed stockpiles in the French Mandate of Syria and transport them to Iraq. The French also agreed to allow passage of other weapons and material and loaned several airbases in northern Syria to Germany, for the transport of German aircraft to Iraq. Between 9 May and the end of the month, about 100 German and about 20 Italian aircraft landed on Syrian airfields.

On 30 April, the Iraqi Army surrounded and besieged RAF Habbaniya; the base had no operational aircraft but the RAF converted trainers to carry weapons and a battalion of infantry reinforcements was flown in. German and Italian aircraft supported the Iraqi army and British reinforcements were dispatched to Iraq from Transjordan and India. The larger but poorly trained Iraqi force was defeated and Baghdad and Mosul were captured. Ali and his supporters fled the country and an armistice was signed, restoring the monarchy of Faisal II, the Kingdom of Iraq and a pro-British government. The defeat of the rebellion saw the defeat of the German-Italian attempt to entrench an Axis state in Iraq and worsened relations between the UK and Vichy France, culminating in the Syria-Lebanon Campaign.

Operation Exporter 

In Operation Exporter, Australian, Free French, British and Indian units invaded Syria and Lebanon from Palestine in the south on 8 June 1941. Vigorous resistance was met from the Vichy French but superior Allied infantry equipment and numbers overwhelmed the defenders. More attacks were launched at the end of June and early July from Iraq into northern and central Syria, by Iraqforce. By 8 July, north-east Syria had been captured and elements of Iraqforce had advanced up the river Euphrates towards Aleppo, the rear of the Vichy forces defending Beirut from the advance from the south. Negotiations for an armistice were started on 11 July and surrender terms signed on 14 July.

Iran 

Supplies to the Soviet Union had been sent via the North Cape to Murmansk and Archangel soon after the German invasion but the number of ships available was limited and convoys were vulnerable to German air and submarine attack. Supplies were also sent from American pacific ports to Vladivostok in Soviet-flagged ships but Allied planners wished to open another supply route through Iran. Though officially neutral, the Shah was widely viewed as pro-German by the allies. Following the Shah's refusal to open Iran up as a supply route for war materiel to the USSR; the allies invaded and occupied Iran in August 1941. The Shah, who urged his military not to resist the invasion,  was deposed and his young son placed on the throne as titular head of an allied controlled puppet government. Iranian oil fields were secured and the line of supply to Russia established and maintained for the remainder of the war.

Gibraltar and Malta 

Gibraltar commanded the entrance to the Mediterranean and had been a British fortress since the early 18th century. The territory provided a strongly defended harbour, from which ships could operate in the Atlantic and the Mediterranean. Force H (Vice-Admiral James Somerville) was based in Gibraltar and had the task of maintaining naval superiority and providing a strong escort for convoys to and from the Malta. After the first Italian air attacks it became clear that Malta could be defended and in early July, the Gladiators were reinforced by twelve Hawker Hurricane fighters.

The Kriegsmarine began operations in the Mediterranean with establishment of the 23rd U-boat Flotilla at a base on Salamis Island in Greece in September 1941. The flotilla was to operate against British supply convoys to Allied forces on Malta and in Tobruk. On 7 December, control of the 23rd Flotilla was transferred from Kernével to Field Marshal Albert Kesselring, Commander in Chief South (OB Süd) in Italy. Additional bases were established in Pola and La Spezia in northern Italy, as more U-boats were sent to the Mediterranean.

Bombing and the naval blockade led to food and commodity shortages and rationing was imposed on the inhabitants. Luftwaffe reinforcements in the Mediterranean joined in the bombing but during a lull in early 1942, 61 Supermarine Spitfires were delivered, which very much improved the defensive situation, although food, ammunition, and fuel were still short. Supply runs during lulls in the bombing kept Malta in being but many ships like  were damaged too severely to leave. The defence of the island ensured that the Allies had an advantage in the fight to control the Mediterranean and as the garrison recovered from periods of intense bombing, aircraft, submarines and light surface ships resumed attacks on Axis supply ships, leading to fuel and supply shortages for the Axis forces in Libya.

Allied reply

North Africa 

During 1941, the British launched several offensives to push back the Axis forces in North Africa. Operation Brevity failed as did Operation Battleaxe but Operation Crusader, the third and larger offensive was launched at the end of the year. Over December 1941 into early 1942, Allied forces pushed the Italian-German forces back through Libya to roughly the limit of the previous Operation Compass advance. Taking advantage of the Allied position, German forces counter-attacked and pushed back the Allies to Gazala, west of Tobruk. As both sides prepared offensives, the Axis forces struck first and inflicted a big defeat upon the Allied forces during the Battle of Gazala. The routed Allied forces retreated to Egypt where they made a stand at El Alamein.

Following the First Battle of El Alamein, which had stalled the Axis advance into Egypt, British forces went onto the offensive in October. The Second Battle of El Alamein marked a watershed in the Western Desert Campaign and turned the tide in the North African Campaign. It ended the Axis threat to Egypt, the Suez Canal and of gaining access to the Middle Eastern and Persian oil fields via North Africa. As the Eighth Army pushed west across the desert, capturing Libya, German forces occupied southern France and landed in Tunisia. On 8 November, Allied forces launched Operation Torch landing in various places across French North Africa. In December 1942, after a 101-day British blockade, French Somaliland fell to the Allies.

US involvement 

Following the Japanese attack on Pearl Harbor on 7 December 1941, the United States joined the war.  On 8 November 1942, American forces entered combat in North Africa with Operation Torch, which "transformed the Mediterranean from a British to an Allied theater of war",  "succeeding operations in the Mediterranean area proved far more extensive than intended. One undertaking was to lead to the next".

After liberating French North Africa and clearing the enemy from the Italian colonies, the Allies sought to bring the entire French empire effectively into the war against the Axis powers. They reopened the Mediterranean route to the Middle East. They went on from Africa to liberate Sicily, Sardinia, and Corsica. They caused Mussolini to topple from power, and they brought his successors to surrender. They drew more and more German military resources into a stubborn defence of the Italian peninsula, and helped the Yugoslavs to pin down within their spirited country thousands of Axis troops. Eventually, the Allies delivered a solid blow from southern France against the German forces which were opposing the Allied drive from the beaches of Normandy! They made Marseilles available for Allied use and they occupied northern Italy and Greece." Howe further notes that "Hitler had always accepted the principle that the Mediterranean was an area of paramount Italian interest just as, farther north, German interests were exclusive.

Allied forces were placed under the command of a Supreme Allied Commander AFHQ Mediterranean, General Dwight D. Eisenhower. Axis forces were caught between the Allied armies during the Tunisia Campaign but managed to delay the Allied advance by defensive operations, most notably with the Battle of the Kasserine Pass and a temporary defensive success at the Battle of the Mareth Line. After shattering the Axis defence on the Mareth Line, the Allies squeezed Axis forces into a pocket around Tunis. Axis resistance in Africa ended on 13 May 1943, with the unconditional surrender of nearly 240,000 men, who became prisoners of war.

Southern Europe

Italian campaign 

Following the Allied victory in North Africa the Allies invaded Sicily in Operation Husky on 10 July 1943, with amphibious and airborne landings. The Germans were unable to prevent the Allied capture of the island but evacuated most of their troops and equipment to the mainland before the Allies entered Messina on 17 August. On 25 July, the Italian government deposed Mussolini, the Italian leader, who was subsequently arrested. The new government announced that it would continue the war but secretly commenced negotiations with the Allies.

The Allied invasion of Italy started when the British Eighth Army landed in the toe of Italy on 3 September 1943, in Operation Baytown. The Italian government signed the surrender the same day, believing they would be given time to make preparations against the anticipated German intervention. The Allies announced the Armistice of Cassibile on 8 September and German forces implemented plans to occupy the Italian peninsula. On 9 September, American and British forces of the US Fifth Army landed at Salerno in Operation Avalanche and more British airborne troops landed at Taranto in Operation Slapstick. German forces which had escaped from Sicily were concentrated against Avalanche, while additional forces were brought in to occupy Rome and disarm the Italian Army in central and northern Italy.

The Germans were unable to prevent the Italian fleet sailing to Malta, although the battleship Roma was sunk by the Luftwaffe on 9 September. In the occupied areas of southern Europe and the Mediterranean, German forces rapidly disarmed and captured Italian troops, putting down any resistance they offered in Yugoslavia, southern France and Greece. Meanwhile, on 16 September, a German airborne force led by Otto Skorzeny rescued Mussolini from the mountain resort in the Gran Sasso where he was being held. A puppet government headed by Mussolini was subsequently set up in northern Italy as the successor state to the former fascist government.

As the campaign in Italy continued, the rough terrain prevented fast movement and proved ideal for defence, the Allies continued to push the Germans northwards through the rest of the year. The German prepared defensive line called the Winter Line (parts of which were called the Gustav Line) proved a major obstacle to the Allies at the end of 1943, halting the advance. Operation Shingle, an amphibious assault at Anzio behind the line was intended to break it, but did not have the desired effect. The line was eventually broken by frontal assault at the Fourth Battle of Monte Cassino in the Spring of 1944 and Rome was captured in June.

Following the fall of Rome, the Normandy landings (6 June 1944) that began Operation Overlord and the Red Army victories on the Eastern Front, the Italian campaign became of secondary importance to both sides. The Gothic Line north of Rome was not broken until the Spring offensive of 1945. From 1944 to the end of war, the Italian Front was made up of a multi-national Allied force of Americans (including segregated African and Japanese-Americans), Brazilians, British, Canadians, Czechs, French, Greeks, anti-fascist Italians, the 2nd New Zealand Division, Poles, South Africans and Rhodesians as well as members of the British and French empires, including the 3rd Algerian Infantry Division, Gurkhas, Indians, Moroccans and forces raised in Mandatory Palestine. On 1 May, SS General Karl Wolff and the Commander-in-Chief of the German 10th Army, General Heinrich von Vietinghoff, after Operation Sunrise (protracted, clandestine, negotiations with the Allies), ordered German armed forces in Italy to make an unconditional surrender to the Allies on 2 May 1945.

Dodecanese Campaign 

The brief campaign in the Italian-held Dodecanese Islands resulted as both Germany and the Allies scrambled to occupy them after the surrender of Italy in early September 1943. The main island of Rhodes was swiftly secured by German forces, but British garrisons were established on most islands by mid-September. German air superiority, tactical prowess, and the absence of Allied reinforcements doomed the Allied effort, however. German forces, including paratroopers and Brandenburger commandos, launched a counter-offensive, capturing the island of Kos within two days in early October. A massive 50-day-long aerial campaign was launched against the island of Leros defended by Italian troops commanded by Admiral Mascherpa, who resisted the German air offensive before the landing of British support troops, which was invaded by the Germans who landed by sea and air on 12 November and surrendered four days later. The remaining British garrisons were then evacuated to the Middle East.

Invasion of southern France 

On 15 August 1944, in an effort to aid their operations in Normandy, the Allies launched Operation Dragoon – the invasion of Southern France between Toulon and Cannes. The Allies rapidly broke out of their beachheads and fanned out north and east to join up with the American 12th Army Group which was breaking out of the Normandy beachhead. In early September supreme command of the 6th Army Group moved from AFHQ to SHAEF and the 6th Army Group moved out of the Mediterranean Theatre and into the European Theatre fighting as one of three Allied army groups on the Western Front.

Post-war conflicts

Trieste 
At the end of the war in Europe, on 1 May 1945, troops of the 4th Army of the Socialist Federal Republic of Yugoslavia and the Slovene 9th Corpus NLA occupied the town of Trieste. The Germans surrendered to the Allies which entered the town the following day. The Yugoslavs had to leave the town some days after.

Greece 

Allied forces, which had been sent to Greece in October 1944 after the German withdrawal, opened fire on the public during the demonstration on the 3rd of December of that year, which began the Greek Civil War.

Syria 

In Syria, nationalist protests were on the rise at the continued occupation of the Levant by France in May 1945. French forces then tried to quell the protests but concern with heavy Syrian casualties forced Winston Churchill to oppose French action there. After being rebuffed by Charles De Gaulle he ordered British forces under general Bernard Paget into Syria from Jordan with orders to fire on the French if necessary. A crisis began as British armoured cars and troops then reached the Syrian capital Damascus following which the French were escorted and confined to their barracks. With political pressure added the French ordered a ceasefire; following which the French withdrew from Syria the following year.

Palestine 

Prior to the war the British Mandate in Palestine was faced with ethnic violence between the Muslim population and The Jewish population in Mandatory Palestine, that carried over into the war. After the war the 1947–48 Civil War in Mandatory Palestine began between Arab forces, Zionist forces and the British administration that lasted until 1948 and later drew in neighbouring nations into the conflict causing the start of the 1948 Arab–Israeli War.

See also 

 North African campaign timeline
 List of World War II Battles
 Mediterranean U-boat Campaign (World War II)
 Military history of Gibraltar during World War II

Notes

Citations

References

Books

Journals

External links 

 Mediterranean sources and US Official accounts
 The Mediterranean and Middle East Volume I The Early Successes against Italy (to May 1941). 1954
 The Mediterranean and Middle East Volume II The Germans come to the Help of their Ally (1941). 1956

 
Theaters and campaigns of World War II
African theatres of World War II
World War II
World War II
World War II